Liviu Giurgian (26 July 1962  – 12 July 2017) was a Romanian athlete who specialised in the sprint hurdles. He represented his country at two outdoor and two indoor World Championships.

His personal bests were 13.47 seconds in the 110 metres hurdles (+0.9 m/s, Bucharest 1986) and 7.53 seconds in the 60 metres hurdles (Bacau 1988).

International competitions

References

1962 births
2017 deaths
Romanian male hurdlers
Competitors at the 1986 Goodwill Games